Golden Palace Hotel Resort and Spa, is a 5-star grand luxury hotel in Tsaghkadzor, a popular spa town and health resort in Kotayk Province, Armenia. It was opened in 2013 and is operated by the Australian Luxury Group organization.

With 120 guestrooms, the Golden Palace Hotel is the largest hotel in Armenia outside the capital Yerevan.

History and location
The 5-story domed Golden Palace Hotel was officially opened on 2 March 2013, with the presence of president Serzh Sargsyan.

It is the second hotel opened by the Golden Palace LLC in Armenia, after the Golden Palace Yerevan (later turned into Radisson Blu Yerevan).

The Golden Palace Hotel Resort and Spa is located on a hill near Mount Teghenis of the Tsaghkunyats mountain range, approximately 2100 meters above sea level, around 55 km north of the capital Yerevan. The resort is adjacent to the Tsaghkadzor ski resort and the Tsaghkadzor ski lift, on 34/1 Tandzaghbyur Street. The Tsaghkadzor Olympic Sports Complex is also very close to the resort.

The hotel is the only officially recognized 5-star Grand Luxury Hotel in the region.

Features

The hotel has 120 guestrooms, including 26 suites (with royal and presidential suites). The hotel is home to 4 conference halls (Grand hall, Tsaghkadzor hall, Hayk the Great hall, and Hayk the Small hall), a health and spa centre, an indoor swimming pool, an indoor tennis court, and a large billiards hall. The hotel is topped with a gold-coloured central dome, while the building is covered with white marble.

Inside the dome of the hotel, the work of renowned artist Ruben Yeghiazaryan could be seen painted on the ceiling.

The hotel has 2 restaurants and a cigar bar. With its unique design, the lobby bar of the hotel is the largest in Armenia.

Casino
Tsaghkadzor is among the 4 towns of Armenia that are allowed to accommodate gambling houses and activities in urban settlements. The Golden Palace Hotel is home to the "Senator Casino", one of the few elite casinos in Armenia. It has 3 game halls: large, VIP and private. The "Senator Golden Palace" casino is among the largest entertainment centers in Armenia.

Notable events
Golden Palace Tsaghkadzor hosted the 2015 FIDE World Team Chess Championship between 18 and 29 April 2015. The opening ceremony of the championship took place in the large lobby of the hotel with an artistic performance attended by the president of Armenia Serzh Sargsyan (who is also the president of the Armenian Chess Federation), the FIDE president Kirsan Ilyumzhinov, and the delegates of the 10 participant countries. The event coincided with the 100th anniversary of the Armenian genocide which had its reflection in the opening ceremony. The Chinese national team had eventually won the title.

See also

References

External links
World Team Chess Championship 2015 opening in Tsaghkadzor

Hotels established in 2013
Hotels in Armenia